The 1984 Southwest Conference men's basketball tournament was held March 9-11, 1984 at The Summit in Houston, Texas. The first round took place March 6 at the higher seeded campus sites. 

Number 1 seed Houston defeated 2 seed Arkansas 57-56 to win their 4th championship and receive the conference's automatic bid to the 1984 NCAA tournament.

Format and seeding 
The tournament consisted of 9 teams in a single-elimination tournament. The 3 seed received a bye to the Quarterfinals and the 1 and 2 seed received a bye to the Semifinals.

Tournament

References 

1983–84 Southwest Conference men's basketball season
Basketball in Houston
Southwest Conference men's basketball tournament